This is an alphabetical list of cricketers who have played for Central Sparks since their founding in 2020. They first played in the Rachael Heyhoe Flint Trophy, a 50 over competition that began in 2020. In 2021, the Twenty20 Charlotte Edwards Cup was added to the women's domestic structure in England.

Players' names are followed by the years in which they were active as a Central Sparks player. Seasons given are first and last seasons; the player did not necessarily play in all the intervening seasons. Current players are shown as active to the latest season in which they played for the club. This list only includes players who appeared in at least one match for Central Sparks; players who were named in the team's squad for a season but did not play a match are not included.

A
 Emily Arlott (2020–2022)

B
 Hannah Baker (2020–2022)
 Gabrielle Basketter (2022)
 Clare Boycott (2020–2022)
 Thea Brookes (2020–2022)
 Stephanie Butler (2020–2022)

C
 Ami Campbell (2022)

D
 Gwenan Davies (2020–2022)
 Poppy Davies (2020–2021)
 Georgia Davis (2020–2022)

F
 Ria Fackrell (2021–2022)
 Abigail Freeborn (2022)

G
 Sarah Glenn (2020–2022)

H
 Chloe Hill (2020–2021)
 Milly Home (2020–2022)

J
 Amy Jones (2020–2022)
 Evelyn Jones (2020–2022)

K
 Marie Kelly (2020–2021)

P
 Anisha Patel (2020–2022)
 Davina Perrin (2021–2022)
 Grace Potts (2021–2022)

R
 Elizabeth Russell (2020–2022)

W
 Issy Wong (2020–2022)

Captains

References

Central Sparks